Huntsville Transit provides local bus service in the town of Huntsville in the Muskoka Region of Ontario, Canada. They run two scheduled routes, but operations are flexible enough to accommodate the pick-up and drop-off of wheelchair clients and buses can be flagged down by other riders anywhere along the route.

See also

 Public transport in Canada

References

External links
 Transit History of Ontario Communities

Bus transport in Ontario
Transit agencies in Ontario
Transport in Huntsville, Ontario